Ulster English (also called Northern Hiberno-English or Northern Irish English) is the variety of English spoken in most of the Irish province of Ulster and throughout Northern Ireland. The dialect has been influenced by the Ulster Irish and Scots languages, the latter of which was brought over by Scottish settlers during the Plantation of Ulster and subsequent settlements throughout the 17th and 18th centuries.

The two major divisions of Ulster English are Mid-Ulster English, the most widespread variety, and Ulster Scots English, spoken in much of northern County Antrim along a continuum with the Scots language. Southern Ulster English is a transitional dialect between Mid-Ulster English and Hiberno-English.

Phonology
In general, Ulster English speakers' declarative sentences (with typical grammatical structure, i.e. non-topicalized statements) end with a rise in pitch, which is often heard by speakers of non-Ulster English as a question-like intonation pattern.

The following phonetics are represented using the International Phonetic Alphabet (IPA).

Vowels
In the following chart, "UE" refers to Ulster English, which  includes Mid-Ulster English (which may incorporate older, more traditional Mid-Ulster English), as well as Ulster Scots (English). "SSIE" here refers to a mainstream, supraregional southern Hiberno-English, used in the chart for the sake of comparison.

Other, less overarching features of some Ulster varieties include:
Vowels have phonemic vowel length, with one set of lexically long and one of lexically short phonemes. This may be variously influenced by the Scots system. It is considerably less phonemic than Received Pronunciation, and in vernacular Belfast speech vowel length may vary depending on stress.
 and  distinction in cot and body versus caught and bawdy is mostly preserved, except in Ulster Scots (which here follows Scottish speech) and traditional varieties.
 may occur in such words as beat, decent, leave, Jesus, etc., though this feature is recessive.
Lagan Valley  before  in take and make, etc.
 before velars, as in sack, bag, and bang, etc.
Merger of – in all monosyllables, e.g. Sam and psalm  (the phonetic quality varies).
 is possible in rural speech before  in  words like floor, whore, door, board, etc.
Vowels are short before .

Consonants
Palatalisation of   before  is a recessive feature of rural speakers or older Catholic speakers in Belfast.
 is not vocalised, except historically; usually "clear" as in Southern Hiberno-English, with some exceptions.
Unaspirated ,  between vowels in words such as pepper and packet.
This is similar to North American and Australian English.
Dental realisations of  may occur as well, e.g. dinner, pillar. This feature, shared with Southern Hiberno-English, has its origins in English and Scots.
– contrast in which–witch. This feature is recessive, particularly in vernacular Belfast speech.
  for gh is retained in proper names and a few dialect words or pronunciations, e.g. lough, trough and sheugh.

Grammar derived from Irish or Scottish Gaelic

The morphology and syntax of Irish is quite different from that of English, and it has influenced both Northern and Southern Hiberno-English to some degree.

Irish has separate forms for the second person singular (tú) and the second person plural (sibh), ("thou" and "ye" respectively in archaic and some intimate, informal English). Ulster English mirrors Irish in that the singular "you" is distinguished from the plural "you". This is normally done by using the words yous, yousuns or yis. For example:

 "Are yous not finished yet?"
 "Did yousuns all go to see it?"
 "What are yis up to?"

Irish lacks words that directly translate as "yes" or "no", and instead repeats the verb in a question (positively or negatively) to answer. As such, Northern and Southern Hiberno-English use "yes" and "no" less frequently than other English dialects. For example:

 "Are you coming home soon?"  "I am"
 "Is your computer working?" "It's not"

This is not necessarily true in Ulster English where "Aye" for yes and "Naw" for no are used, probably a Scottish influence.

The absence of the verb "have" in Irish has influenced some grammar. The concept of "have" is expressed in Irish by the construction ag ("at") mé ("me") to create agam ("at me"). Hence, Ulster English speakers sometimes use the verb "have" followed by "with me/on me". For example:

 "Do you have the book with you?"
 "Have you money for the bus on you?"

Vocabulary
Much non-standard vocabulary found in Ulster English and many meanings of Standard English words peculiar to the dialect come from Scots and Irish.  Some examples are shown in the table below. Many of these are also used in Southern Hiberno-English, especially in the northern half of the island.

Furthermore, speakers of the dialect conjugate many verbs according to how they are formed in the most vernacular forms of Ulster Scots, e.g. driv instead of drove and driven as the past tense of drive, etc. (literary Scots drave, driven). Verbal syncretism is extremely widespread, as is the Northern subject rule.

Mid-Ulster English

The speech in southern and western County Donegal, southern County Tyrone, southern County Londonderry, northern County Fermanagh, north County Armagh, southwestern County Antrim and most of County Down form a geographical band across the province from east to west. On the whole, these areas have much more in common with the Derry accent in the west than inner-city Belfast in the east. This accent is often claimed as being the "standard" Northern Irish dialect as it is the most widely used. Parts of the north of County Monaghan (an area centred on Monaghan Town and known as North Monaghan) would roughly fall into this category, but only to a certain extent. Bundoran, a town at the southern extremity of County Donegal, also has quite a western Ireland accent, as do parts of the south-west extremity of County Fermanagh.

Belfast and surroundings
The broad, working-class Belfast dialect is not limited to the city itself but also takes in neighbouring urban areas in the local vicinity (such as Lisburn, Carrickfergus and Newtownards), as well as towns whose inhabitants originally came from Belfast (such as Craigavon). It is generally perceived as being associated with economically disadvantaged areas, and with youth culture. This however is not the dialect used in the media (even those outlets which are based in Belfast).

The Belfast dialect is now becoming more frequently heard in towns and villages whose inhabitants would have traditionally spoken with a distinctively rural accent. Examples of such areas are Moira, Ballyclare, Dromore and Ballynahinch. It could be said that many young people in these areas prefer to use the more cosmopolitan city accent, as opposed to the local variant that their parents or people in other areas would use.

Other phonological features include the following:

Thus days  and daze  are not homophonous.
Thus stock  is distinct from stalk . However, this is complicated by the fact that certain words belonging to the Standard Lexical Set THOUGHT have  rather than the expected . These typically include draw, fall, walk, and caught. Water often has  (the TRAP vowel).
The  phoneme is pronounced  in most of Ulster, but in Belfast it is extremely variable and is a sensitive social marker. Pronunciations with a relatively front first element,  or fronter, are working class. Middle class speakers prefer back  or even .

Some of the vocabulary used among young people in Ulster, such as the word "spide", is of Belfast origin.

Derry and surroundings
The accent of Derry City, which is also heard in northeastern County Donegal (including Inishowen), and northern and western County Tyrone (including Strabane). "kyar" for "car"). However, the most noticeable difference is perhaps the intonation, which is unique to the Derry, Letterkenny and Strabane area. The accent of the Finn Valley and especially The Laggan district (centred on the town of Raphoe), both in East Donegal, together with the accent of neighbouring West Tyrone and the accent of the westernmost parts of County Londonderry (not including Derry City), are also quite Scottish sounding. A variety of Ulster Scots is spoken in these areas. This West Ulster variety of Ulster Scots is considered to be quite similar to the Scots spoken in Ayrshire in south-west Scotland.

Ulster Scots English

This region is heavily influenced by the historic presence of Scots and covers areas such as northern and eastern County Antrim, the Ards Peninsula in County Down, The Laggan district in County Donegal and northeastern County Londonderry. The strong Scots influence is noticeable in those districts and Scots pronunciations are often heard. People from here are often mistaken by outsiders as Scottish. This area includes the Glens of Antrim, where the last native Irish speakers of a dialect native to what is now Northern Ireland were to be found. It has been stated that, in the written form, Gaelic of this area continued to use standardised Irish forms, while the spoken dialect continued to use the Scottish variant, and was in effect not different from the Scots Gaelic of Argyll and Galloway.

In the 1830s, Ordnance Survey memoirs came to the following conclusion about the dialect of the inhabitants of Carnmoney, east Antrim: "Their accent is peculiarly, and among old people disagreeably, strong and broad." The BBC conducted a sociolinguistic survey of Ulster Scots grammar. East Donegal also has a strong Ulster Scots dialect (see below).

South Ulster English
South Armagh, south Monaghan, south Fermanagh, south Donegal, and a small part of north Leitrim, and north Cavan natives speak their own distinct variety of English. Areas such as southern and western County Armagh, central and southern County Monaghan (known locally as South Monaghan), northern County Cavan and the southern 'strip' of County Fermanagh are the hinterland of the larger Mid-Ulster dialect. The accent gradually shifts from village to village, forming part of the dialect continuum between areas to the North and Midlands (as it once did in Gaelic). This accent is also used in north County Louth (located in Leinster) and in part of the northern 'strip' of County Leitrim (in Connacht). There are areas that show a mixture of accents with Ulster-English and Hiberno-English.

These areas fall along the east coastline. South Ulster English's phonology is markedly different from Ulster Scots and majority Ulster English in several aspects, including preservation of dichotomous pattern of phonemic vowel length seen in Middle English. Another feature of South Ulster English is the drop in pitch on stressed syllables.

See also
 Ulster Scots
 Ulster Irish
 Languages of Ireland
 Hiberno-English

Bibliography

Wells, J.C. (1982).  Accents of English 2: The British Isles.  Cambridge University Press 1986.

References

Further reading

External links
 A til Azed – a glossary of Mid-Ulster vocabulary at BBC Northern Ireland
 South West Tyrone Dialect, South West Tyrone Dialect

British English
Dialects of English
Languages of Ireland
Languages of Northern Ireland
Ulster